Name the Man is a surviving 1924 American silent drama film directed by Victor Sjöström and starring Mae Busch. It was produced and distributed by Goldwyn Pictures in association with Cosmopolitan Productions.

Plot
Arriving home late one evening Bessie is turned out of her home by her stepfather Dan Collister. She has nowhere to go. Bessie is befriended by Victor Stowell, son of the Deemster or Judge of the Isle of Man. Victor is engaged to Fenella Stanley, the daughter of the Island's governor. Bessie stays the night in Victor's apartments. Victor's best friend Alick Gell, tells Victor of his love for Bessie. Victor sees an opportunity for ending his affair with Bessie. Victor's father dies and he succeeds him as Deemster. Later Bessie is arrested and tried for killing her child. The judge trying the case is Victor, the child's father. Bessie is found guilty and is to be executed.  An infuriated mob gathers around the prison demanding the name of the man. There are two women who know, Bessie and Fenella who had challenged Victor and obtained his confession. Bessie escapes from prison, where she is awaiting the death sentence. Victor is caught and stoned by the crowd for his share in helping her to escape.

Cast

Preservation status
Name the Man survives in the Cinematheque royale de Belgique in Brussels, Cinemateket-Svenska Filminstitutet in Stockholm, and the Gosfilmofond archive in Moscow.

References

External links

Articles relating to Name the Man at Trove (National Library of Australia)
Stills at silenthollywood.com
Stills and poster at silentfilmstillarchive.com

1924 films
Films directed by Victor Sjöström
Films based on British novels
Goldwyn Pictures films
American silent feature films
American black-and-white films
1924 drama films
Silent American drama films
1920s American films
1920s English-language films